Christopher Weissberg (born 26 November 1985 in Neuilly) is a French member of parliament. He represents French people abroad, in North America.

Following the appointment of Roland Lescure in the Borne government, he became deputy for the First constituency for French residents overseas

He joined the Renaissance group.

References

1985 births
Living people
People from Neuilly-sur-Seine
Deputies of the 16th National Assembly of the French Fifth Republic
Members of Parliament for French people living outside France